Allt a' Chaol Ghlinne—also spelled Allt a' Chaol-ghlinne—is a river in the Lochaber area of Highland, Scotland. Located in a glen (valley) within the Northwest Highlands of the Scottish Highlands, Allt a' Chaol Ghlinne is a tributary to the River Finnan, which itself flows into Loch Shiel.

Etymology 
Allt a' Chaol Ghlinne means "Burn of the Narrow Glen."

Course 
Rising near the Meall Coire na Saobhaidh mountain in the Northwest Highlands, Allt a' Chaol Ghlinne flows an easterly course, receiving its waters from a large drainage basin in the valley north of Sgùrr an Fhuarain Duibh. After curving southeast, Allt a' Chaol Ghlinne reaches Corryhully, where it flows into the River Finnan.

References 

Rivers of Highland